The 2020–21 Auburn Tigers men's basketball team represented Auburn University during the 2020–21 NCAA Division I men's basketball season as a member of the Southeastern Conference. The team's head coach is Bruce Pearl in his seventh season at Auburn.  The team played their home games at Auburn Arena in Auburn, Alabama. 

On November 22, 2020, the team announced a self-imposed, one year postseason ban due to former assistant coach Chuck Person's involvement in the 2017–18 NCAA Division I men's basketball corruption scandal.

Previous season
The 2019–20 Auburn Tigers men's basketball team finished the 2019–20 season 25–6, 12–6 in SEC play. The Tigers earned the No. 2 seed in the SEC tournament, but the tournament was canceled due to the COVID-19 pandemic. The NCAA tournament, in which Auburn was expected to participate, was also cancelled.

Offseason

Departures
Auburn lost seniors Thomas Collier, Samir Doughty, Will Macoy, J'Von McCormick, Anfernee McLemore, Danjel Purifoy, and Austin Wiley to graduation. In addition, freshman Isaac Okoro declared for the NBA draft and sophomore Myles Parker transferred to Alabama A&M.

2020 recruiting class

2021 Recruiting class

Preseason

SEC media poll
The SEC media poll was released on November 12, 2020.

Roster

Schedule and results

|-
!colspan=9 style=|Regular season

|-

The game between Auburn and Mississippi State was postponed due to inclement weather.  The game was originally scheduled for February 16.

Rankings

*AP does not release post-NCAA Tournament rankings

References 

Auburn
Auburn Tigers men's basketball seasons
Auburn Tigers men's basketball
Auburn Tigers men's basketball